The Caspar Samler farm was a tract of land comprising the greater part of Fifth Avenue from Madison Square to 31st Street in what is now the Koreatown section of Manhattan, New York City, New York.

History
The tract of Common Lands from 28th to 32nd Streets, through which Park Avenue was later projected, was part of the  farm which Caspar Samler bought in various pieces, from the City, between 1780 and 1799 for $12,100. The area now known as Madison Square Garden was owned in 1780 by Samuel, Henry, and Matthias Nicoll, and it was sold to Caspar Samler for US$2,250, becoming part of the 37 acre Caspar Samler farm. Three distinct Samler houses were located on the Commissioners' map of 1807.

Samler had several children and one step daughter, Margaret Grenzeback. He died in 1810, and his daughter Barbara died in 1816 without having ever had children. The 5 acres, 3 roods, and 32 perches of land which were devised for her children, became therefore the property of the survivors of Samler's children or grand children according to the provision of his will. Subsequently, litigation arose as to whether the children of his step daughter Margaret Grenzeback were entitled to a portion under the designation of grandchildren.

Some well-known buildings of the time later stood on the site. Among them were the Brunswick Hotel, at the northeast corner of 26th Street, once famous as the headquarters of the New York Coaching Club; and the Hotel Victoria, at the southwest corner of 27th Street, patronized at one time by Grover Cleveland, and later demolished to make way for a 20-story business structure. The Marble Collegiate Church at 29th Street and the Holland House at 30th Street also stood on sites once part of the Samler farm.

North of the Caspar Samler farm, extending on Fifth Avenue from near 32nd almost to 36th Streets, were the 30 acres of land bought in 1799 by John Thompson. In 1827, William Backhouse Astor, Sr. bought a half interest, including Fifth Avenue from 32nd to 35th Streets, for US$20,500. He built an unpretentious square red brick house on the southwest corner of 34th Street and Fifth Avenue, while John Jacob Astor erected a home at the northwest corner of 33rd Street. The Waldorf Hotel, opened in 1893, occupied the former site of John Jacob Astor's house. The Astoria Hotel, opened in 1897, stood on the site of William Backhouse Astor's house. The two hotels, under one management, became known as the Waldorf-Astoria, which was razed in 1929 to make way for construction of the Empire State Building.

References
Notes

b. The name is variously Samler, Semler, Semlear, etc. Semler Name Meaning German and Jewish (Ashkenazic): occupational name for a baker of white rolls, from an agent derivative of Middle High German semel, German Semmel, Yiddish zeml ‘white bread roll’ (from Middle High German semel(e), simel ‘fine wheat flour’). Such rolls were in contrast to the coarse rye bread that was and is the norm in many households. Source: Dictionary of American Family Names ©2013, Oxford University Press

Citations

Bibliography

Farms in New York City
Fifth Avenue
History of Manhattan
Midtown Manhattan